Mehdi Dibaj (1935 – June/July 1994) was an Iranian Christian convert from Shia Islam, pastor and Christian martyr.

Background
Dibaj became a Christian as a young man and joined the Presbyterian church, but years later, he joined the church of Assembly of God, the Iranian branch of the Jama'at-e Rabbani Church. After the 1979 Iranian revolution he encountered difficulties. In 1983 he was arrested and imprisoned without trial in Sari and systematically tortured. During his imprisonment he was held in solitary confinement in a dark cell a metre in height, width and depth for two years. He was finally tried by an Islamic court in Sari on 3 December 1993 and sentenced to death on charges of apostasy.

On 18 January 1994, Bernard Levin reprinted Dibaj's courtroom speech in place of his usual column in The Times as a mark of respect.

Following a worldwide outcry initiated by his friend and colleague Bishop Haik Hovsepian Mehr, Dibaj was finally freed in January 1994, although the death sentence was not lifted. Just three days later Haik Hovsepian Mehr was murdered. The Times article and the murder of Hovsepian Mehr was alluded to in a debate in the House of Lords on Iran, and Viscount Brentford cited Levin's comment, 'how insubstantial must the grasp on a religion be, if it has to be propped up by hangings and woundings and beatings and murderings?'

Dibaj was abducted on Friday, 24 June 1994. His body was found in a west Tehran park on Tuesday, 5 July 1994.

See also
 List of kidnappings
 List of solved missing person cases
 List of unsolved murders

References

External links 
 A CRY FROM IRAN. A Documentary on the Religious Persecution in Iran. Haik Hovsepian's story, directed by his sons
 Farsinet on Mehdi Dibaj
 Iran Rights Memorial
 Mehdi Dibaj's court room testimony at Sari, Iran 1993

1935 births
1990s missing person cases
1994 deaths
20th-century Protestant martyrs
20th-century Protestant religious leaders
Assemblies of God pastors
Assemblies of God people
Converts to Pentecostal denominations
Formerly missing people
Iranian former Shia Muslims
Iranian murder victims
Iranian Pentecostals
Iranian prisoners sentenced to death
Kidnapped people
Male murder victims
Missing person cases in Iran
People charged with apostasy in Iran
People murdered in Iran
Persecution of Christians in Iran
Prisoners sentenced to death by Iran
Unsolved murders in Iran